James Akins is an American tubist, music professor, and both a player and maker of Native American flutes.

Education
Akins studied the tuba with Ronald Bishop of the Cleveland Orchestra, Arnold Jacobs of the Chicago Symphony Orchestra, Robert Ryker of the Montreal Symphony, Fredrick Schaufele Jr. at Lakewood High School, and Robert LeBlanc of Ohio State University. He received his Bachelor of Music in 1978 and Master of Music in 1982 from Ohio State University.

Career 
Akins is associate professor of tuba and euphonium at Ohio State University and has been principal tuba of the Columbus Symphony Orchestra since 1981. He is a member of the Columbus Symphony Orchestra Brass Quintet, and the Ohio Brass Quintet. Akins is also a clinician and consultant for the Tuba Exchange in Durham, North Carolina, and has been a design consultant for various tuba companies including the G+P Instrument Company in Milan. As a consultant for the United Musical Instrument Company, he collaborates in the development of professional tubas, developing several new designs. As a clinician for these companies, Akins has given tuba masterclasses and recitals for high schools and colleges throughout the United States. He has also presented masterclasses with the Native American flute and is himself a flute maker. He has taught several tubists, including Carol Jantsch as a beginner. His studio at Ohio State University is one of the largest in the country.

References 

 

American classical tubists
Euphonium players
Native American flute players
Flute makers
Ohio State University faculty
20th-century American musicians
21st-century American musicians
Ohio State University College of Arts and Sciences alumni
American music educators
21st-century tubists
Living people
Year of birth missing (living people)
20th-century flautists
21st-century flautists